Onur Güntürkün (born 18 July 1958, in İzmir) is a Turkish-German neuroscientist. He is professor of behavioral neuroscience at Ruhr University Bochum.
Güntürkün studied psychology at the Ruhr University Bochum from 1975 to 1980 and received his PhD in 1984.

Awards
Gottfried Wilhelm Leibniz Prize (2013)

See also
Bird intelligence
Avian pallium

References

Living people
1958 births
German neuroscientists
Turkish neuroscientists
Academic staff of Ruhr University Bochum